Małachowski (feminine Małachowska) is a Polish surname, it may refer to:

 Adrian Małachowski (born 1998), Polish footballer
 Godzimir Małachowski (1852–1908), Polish lawyer
 Jacek Małachowski (1737–1821), Polish nobleman and politician
 Kazimierz Małachowski (1765–1845), Polish general
 Nicole Malachowski (born 1974), American aviator
 Piotr Małachowski (born 1983), Polish athlete
 Ricardo de Jaxa Malachowski, Peruvian architect
 Stanisław Małachowski (1736–1809), Polish nobleman and politician
 Wilhelm von Malachowski (1914–1980), German military officer
 The House of Małachowski (Nałęcz), a noted Polish family

Polish-language surnames